Aechmea weilbachii is a plant species in the genus Aechmea. This species is endemic to eastern Brazil, known from the States of Espírito Santo and Rio de Janeiro.

Cultivars
Aechmea weilbachii is widely cultivated as an ornamental. Cultivars include

 Aechmea 'Dana J'
 Aechmea 'Distibachii'
 Aechmea 'Orange Sunrise'
 Aechmea 'Orange Sunset'
 Aechmea 'Porphyry Pearls'
 Aechmea 'Purple Gem'
 Aechmea 'Summerland'
 × Aechopsis 'Beacon'

References

weilbachii
Endemic flora of Brazil
Plants described in 1854